Utica University is a private university in Utica, New York. The university has a main campus in Utica, as well as the Robert Brvenik Center for Business Education in Downtown Utica, and satellite locations in Syracuse, New York, Latham, New York, and St. Petersburg, Florida.

Utica University offers 59 majors leading to bachelor degrees, master degrees, and doctoral degrees. The university consists of the School of Arts and Sciences, the School of Business and Justice Studies, and the School of Health Professions and Education.

There are currently over 32,000 Utica University alumni.

History
The history of the university dates back to the 1930s when Syracuse University began offering extension courses in the Utica area. Syracuse University established the university as a four-year institution in 1946. At the time, it was known as Utica College of Syracuse University. In 1995, it became a financially and legally independent institution, operating as Utica College without the Syracuse University affiliation. The university began offering its own graduate degrees in 1999 and its own undergraduate degrees in 2011. By approval of the New York State Board of Regents, Utica College officially changed its name to Utica University on February 17, 2022. The change followed an amendment to the Board's definition of "university" passed the previous month, in which schools are no longer required to offer doctorates in at least three subjects to qualify for university status.

Campus 
Utica University's 128-acre campus is located in a largely residential section of west Utica, directly across Champlin Avenue from the St. Luke's campus of Faxton-St. Luke's Healthcare. The campus has a number of distinctive features, including expansive lawns and green spaces, walkways lined flower beds and ornamental plantings, a large number of mature trees, examples of outdoor sculpture, and significant new construction and recently completed facilities.

Cynkus Family Welcome Center
The Cynkus Family Welcome Center is situated near the main entrance to the University. The building houses the undergraduate admissions office, where prospective students can meet their admissions councilors and serves as the starting point for campus tours. The building also features interview rooms, student ambassador work spaces, and a great room with a fireplace.

Ralph F. Strebel Student Center
The Ralph F. Strebel Student Center houses the main dining commons, a large fireplace lounge, and Strebel Auditorium, which is the venue for student theatrical productions. The building is home to the campus radio station WPNR, as well as the offices for Student Living and Campus Engagement, the student health center, student senate, the campus store and campus safety offices.

Frank E. Gannett Memorial Library
The Frank E. Gannett Memorial Library is a state-of-the-art center for learning and research. The main entrance houses Common Grounds, a student inspired coffee shop that's a favorite stop for beverages, bagels, and more. The library itself features a large number of computer workstations, individual study rooms, private group study spaces, and areas for quiet study on the top floor. It also houses the University's Writing Center and Math and Science Center. There is also a subterranean level that includes the University's art gallery as well as a concourse area for events, recitals, and large gatherings.

Issac Gordon Science Center
The Issac Gordon Science Center includes the general biology laboratory, the microbiology laboratory, and the chemical synthesis laboratory. In 2022, the University built a 25,000 square foot extension called the Science Center Annex, which offers advanced learning in research in science, technology, engineering and mathematics fields. The building also houses the Donahue Auditorium lecture hall and the grab-and-go dining wing Le Bistro.

F. Eugene Romano Hall
The F. Eugene Romano Hall features state-of-the-art physical and occupations therapy laboratories. The building is also home to the Shaheen Nursing Laboratory, which mimics the environment of a functioning hospital floor, equipped with nursing stations, hospital beds and simulation mannequins. The top floor houses advanced laboratory spaces for anatomy and physiology learning and research.

Lauren and Corky Bull Hall 
Lauren and Corky Bull Hall houses the crime laboratory and computer forensics laboratory, in partnership with the U.S. Department of Homeland Security. Utica University's Northeast Cyber Forensics Center and Center for Identity Management and Information Protection are both administered from this building. The building is also home to the Carbone E-sports Auditorium, equipped with 30 gaming computer stations, a main stage with a large screen and spectator seating.

Gary M. Thurston Hall
Gary M. Thurston Hall is the learning facility for the University's Construction Management students. The building features smart classrooms, a fully equipped materials laboratory, and computer laboratories with industry-standard estimating project management and digital modeling software. The building also features the multi-purpose Hislop Auditorium, as well as faculty offices and meeting spaces.

Addison Miller White Hall
Addison Miller White Hall connects the primary academic buildings with faculty offices and a variety of resources for Utica University students, including the registrar, international education, and other campus offices. White hall also opens onto the University's academic quad where students, faculty, and staff often gather.

Moses G. Hubbard Hall
Moses G. Hubbard Hall houses classes that are taught in a broad range of disciplines. The building features classroom spaces, as well as offices for the Center for Student Success, Opportunity Programs, and Learning Services. The building is also the location for the Jeremy Thurston Center for Career Readiness, which offers students career preparation services, as well as access to campus employment, internships, among others.

Harold Thomas Clark Jr. Athletic Center
The Harold Thomas Clark Jr. Athletic Center is the hub of athletic programs, fitness, and recreation. The facility features a 2,200-seat gymnasium, swimming pool, training rooms, free weight rooms, and fully equipped team facilities with saunas. The ground floor houses the Kunath Fitness Center, which offers Nautilus equipment, treadmills, stationary, recumbent bikes, and other equipment. Racquetball courts, dance facilities, and athletic department offices can also be found in the building.

Professor Raymond Simon Convergence Media Center
The Professor Raymond Simon Convergence Media Center is in the Faculty Center building, where faculty offices and instruction rooms are located. The Convergence Media Center is a fully equipped high-definition video facility with a television studio, control room, edit suite, robotic cameras, and an isolation sound booth. The Convergence Media Center also includes a smart classroom with multimedia workstations. Next door to the center is the office of Utica University's award-winning student-run newspaper The Tangerine.

Charles A. Gaetano Stadium
The Charles A. Gaetano Stadium is designed for football, lacrosse, field hockey, soccer, and intramural sports. The facility features seating for 1,200 people, stadium lighting for night games, and a synthetic turf field. Right next door to Gaetano Stadium is the University's new Track and Field Complex. The synthetic turf facility includes eight-lane outdoor track, multi-sport practice field, digital scoreboard, and NCAA compliant lighting system.

Todd and Jen Hutton Sports and Recreation Center
The Todd and Jen Hutton Sports and Recreation center is a 135,000 square-foot multisport facility with an eight-lane, two hundred-meter NCAA competition indoor track. Other features include four multi-sport courts, artificial turf practice field, and a weight room. The state-of-the-art air-supported dome is one of the largest facilities of its kind in North America.

On-Campus Residence Halls
Utica University has seven residence halls for students who choose to live on campus: North Hall, South Hall, Sherwood Boelert Hall, Alumni Hall, Bell Hall, Tower Hall, and Pioneer Village.

Academics 
Utica University offers 40 undergraduate majors, 29 undergraduate minors, and 21 graduate programs. The university is accredited by the Middle States Commission on Higher Education. The chemistry program is approved by the American Chemical Society. Utica University also offers programs in teacher education which lead to certification.

Utica University was the first institution in the world to offer a master's degree in economic crime management.

The university has been designated a National Center of Academic Excellence in Cyber Defense Education (CAE-CD) by the National Security Agency and Department of Homeland Security, designated a National Center of Digital Forensics Academic Excellence (CDFAE) by the Defense Cyber Crime Center and designated an Academic Center of Excellence (ACE) by the EC-Council.

Athletics

Utica University offers 29 NCAA Division III intercollegiate sports.  Teams are known as the Pioneers and compete in the Empire 8 along with Elmira College, Alfred University, Hartwick College, Nazareth College, Stevens Institute of Technology, and Saint John Fisher College.  The men's and women's hockey teams compete in the United Collegiate Hockey Conference athletic conference. The women's water polo team competes in the Collegiate Water Polo Association's Northern Division.

The student body's overall interest in athletics was significantly bolstered by the addition of football and ice hockey teams in 2001, and the addition of men's/women's wrestling and women's gymnastics beginning in 2023-24.

The football, field hockey, soccer and lacrosse teams play in Charles A. Gaetano Stadium. The ice hockey teams compete at the Adirondack Bank Center.  The Aud, as it is commonly called, was built in 1959 and provides seating for 3,850 fans.  The men's hockey team led the nation in Division III home attendance in the 2006–07 and 2007–08 seasons.  The basketball teams play on campus at the Harold Thomas Clark Jr. Athletic Center, which also has a pool and racquetball courts.

In November 2007, the Utica University football team set an NCAA football record, the highest combined score (142 points) by two teams, in their 72–70 loss to Hartwick in four overtimes.  In this game, Utica also set the NCAA record for most points scored (70) by the losing team.

Utica University has a women's basketball team which won the Empire 8 championship in 2008. In 2009, they tied with Ithaca as the regular season Empire 8 champions. In 2010, they regained their Empire 8 championship title.

Student life 
Utica University has a diverse student population, Black Non-Hispanic 228 (10.1%), White Non-Hispanic 1648 (72.8%), Hispanic/Latino 207 (9.1%), American Indian or Alaskan Native 9 (.4%), Asian 67 (3.0%), Pacific Islander 1 (.04%), International 64 (2.9%), Multiple Races 57 (2.5%), Unknown 23 (1.0%). In the Fall of 2020, 50% of that class was women. The Office of International Education actively updates and maintains the flags in Strebel to reflect the home countries of the current international students and the University study abroad partners.

Media 
WPNR, also known as Pioneer Radio, is Utica University’s student-run 24/7 hour radio station featuring a variety of music, live sports broadcasting and public service announcements. WPNR broadcasts games and posts highlight reels on their website, along with various player and coach interviews. WPNR-FM and 90.7 MHz has been the licensed call letters and frequency of Utica University radio since October 22, 1977

The Tangerine is Utica University's student-run newspaper. The newspaper began the same year as the institution in 1946. Originally called the Utica College News, the newspaper's name changed to the Utica College Oracle, then finally settling on the current name The Tangerine, a nod to Syracuse University's school color and athletic moniker, as well as their newspaper The Daily Orange.

Notable alumni
David Ancrum (born 1958), basketball player, top scorer in the 1994 Israel Basketball Premier League
Sherwood Boehlert, B.A. 1961, United States Congressman from January 1983 to January 2007.
Frank Lentricchia, B.A. 1962, literature professor at Duke University.
John M. McHugh, B.A. 1970, United States Congressman from January 1993 to 2009; Secretary of the Army from 2009 to 2015.
Andy Rubin, B.S. 1986, technology pioneer, co-founder and former CEO of both Danger Inc. and Android. He was the Senior Vice President of Mobile and Digital Content at Google.
David P. Weber, B.S. 1995, Woodrow Wilson National Fellowship Foundation Fellow and former Inspector General for the U.S. Securities and Exchange Commission (SEC), whistle blower, concerning Bernard Madoff, Allen Stanford, cyber-compromise matters. Presently a professor in the University System of Maryland.

References

External links

Official athletics website

 
Private universities and colleges in New York (state)
Former Syracuse University satellite colleges
Educational institutions established in 1946
Universities and colleges in Oneida County, New York
1946 establishments in New York (state)